Antonio J. Barrette (May 26, 1899 – December 15, 1968) was a Quebec politician born in Joliette, Quebec, Canada.

Member of the legislature
Barrette ran as a Conservative candidate in the provincial district of Joliette in the 1935 election but lost.  He was elected as a Union Nationale candidate in the 1936 election and was re-elected in the 1939, 1944, 1948, 1952 against Liberal Leader Georges-Émile Lapalme, 1956 and 1960 elections.

Cabinet Member
Barrette served as Minister of Labour in the Cabinets of Maurice Duplessis and Paul Sauvé from August 30, 1944, to January 8, 1960.

Premier of Quebec
After Sauvé's death, Barrette succeeded him as leader of the Union Nationale and as Premier of Quebec on January 8, 1960. He was the 18th premier of Quebec, but he held office for only six months. At the June 1960 election, he lost to Jean Lesage's Quebec Liberal Party.

Retirement
He resigned as both Leader of the Union Nationale and member of the National Assembly on September 15, 1960, and later served as Canadian ambassador to Greece from April 4, 1963, to July 12, 1966. He died in 1968 in Montreal.

See also
Politics of Quebec
List of Quebec general elections
Timeline of Quebec history

References

External links

Foreign Affairs and International Trade Canada Complete List of Posts

1899 births
1968 deaths
People from Joliette
Premiers of Quebec
Ambassadors of Canada to Greece
Union Nationale (Quebec) MNAs
Leaders of the Union Nationale (Quebec)